

Amateur boxing
 April 10–25: 2014 AIBA Youth World Boxing Championships in  Sofia
 Men's light fly winner:  Shalkar Aikhynbay
 Men's fly winner:  Shakur Stevenson
 Men's bantam winner:  Javier Ibanez
 Men's light winner:  Ablaikhan Zhussupov
 Men's light welter winner:  Bibert Tumenov
 Men's welter winner:  Bektemir Melikuziev
 Men's middle winner:  Dmitrii Nesterov
 Men's light heavy winner:  Blagoy Naydenov
 Men's heavy winner:  Yordan Hernandez
 Men's super heavy winner:  Daramni Rock
 Women's fly winner:  Anush Grigoryan
 Women's light winner:  Jajaira Gonzalez
 Women's middle winner:  Elzbieta Wojcik
 August 23–27: 2014 Summer Youth Olympics
  and the  won 2 gold medals each. Cuba, the USA, and  won 3 overall medals each.
 November 13–25: 2014 AIBA Women's World Boxing Championships in  Jeju City
  won both the gold and overall medal tallies.

Fencing
 January 16 – October 26: 2013–14 Fencing World Cup
 June 1–6: 2014 Pan American Fencing Championships in  San José
 Men's Individual Épée winner:  Francisco Limardo
 Men's Individual Foil winner:  Gerek Meinhardt
 Men's Individual Sabre winner:  Eli Dershwitz
 Men's Team Épée winners: 
 Men's Team Foil winners: 
 Men's Team Sabre winner:  
 Women's Individual Épée winner:  Lee Kiefer
 Women's Individual Épée winner:  Courtney Hurley
 Women's Individual Sabre winner:  María Belén Pérez Maurice
 Women's Team Épée winners:  
 Women's Team Foil winners: 
 Women's Team Sabre winners: 
 The  won both the gold and overall medal tallies.
 June 7–14: 2014 European Fencing Championships in  Strasbourg
  won the gold medal tally.  won the overall medal tally.
 June 20–24: 2014 African Fencing Championships in  Cairo
 Host nation, and  won 6 gold medals each. However, Egypt won the overall medal tally.
 July 2–7: 2014 2014 Asian Fencing Championships in  Suwon
 Host nation, won both the gold and overall medal tallies.
 July 15–23: 2014 World Fencing Championships in  Kazan
Italy and Russia won 8 overall medals each.
 August 17–20: 2014 Summer Youth Olympics
 Boys' Individual Sabre:   Ivan Ilin;   Kim Dong-ju;   Yan Yinghui
 Boys' Individual Épée:   Patrik Esztergályos;   Linus Islas Flygare;   Ivan Limarev
 Boys' Individual Foil:   Andrzej Rządkowsk;   Ryan Chun Yin Choi;   Enguerrand Roger
 Girls' Individual Foil:   Sabrina Massialas;   Karin Miyawaki;   Huang Ali
 Girls' Individual Épée:   Lee Sin-hee;   Eleonora de Marchi;   Åsa Linde
 Girls' Individual Sabre:   Alina Moseyko;   Chiara Crovari;  Petra Záhonyi
 Mixed Continental Team:  Team Asia-Oceania One;  Team Europe One;  Team Europe Two
 October 21–26: 2014 FIE World Masters Championships in  Debrecen
  and the  won 5 gold medals each.  won the overall medal tally.

Judo
 January 25 – December 7: 2014 International Judo Federation Calendar of Events
 January 25 – November 9: 2014 AJU African Open
 January 25 & 26: 2014 African Open #1 in  Casablanca
  won both the gold and overall medal tallies.
 November 8 & 9: 2014 African Open #2 (final) in  Port Louis
  and  won 3 gold medals each. Algeria won the overall medal tally.
 February 1 – October 5: 2014 EJU European Open
 February 1 & 2: 2014 European Open #1 in  Sofia
 February 15 & 16: 2014 European Open #2 in  Oberwart
  won both the gold and overall medal tallies.
 February 15 & 16: 2014 European Open #3 in  Rome
  won both the gold and overall medal tallies.
 March 1 & 2: 2014 European Open #4 in  Prague
 Seven different nations all share 1 gold medal each. However,  won the overall medal tally.
 March 1 & 2: 2014 European Open #5 in  Warsaw
 Seven different nations all share 1 gold medal each. However,  won the overall medal tally.
 May 31 & June 1: 2014 European Open #6 in  Madrid
However,  won the overall medal tally.
 September 27 & 28: 2014 European Open #7 in  Tallinn
 The  won the gold medal tally.  won the overall medal tally.
 October 4: 2014 European Open #8 (final and women only) in  Glasgow
  won the gold medal tally.
 October 4 & 5: 2014 European Open #9 (final and men only) in  Lisbon
  won the gold medal tally. Japan and host nation, won 5 overall medals each.
 February 8 – December 7: 2014 IJF Judo Grand Slam
 February 8 & 9 at  Paris
  won the gold medal tally. Host nation, won the overall medal tally.
 May 9–11 at  Baku
  won the gold medal tally.  won the overall medal tally.
 July 12 & 13 at  Tyumen
  won both the gold and overall medal tallies.
 October 31 – November 2 at  Abu Dhabi
  won the gold and overall medal tallies.
 December 5–7 at  Tokyo (final GS)
 Host nation, won both the gold and overall medal tallies.
 February 21 – November 29: 2014 IJF Judo Grand Prix
 February 21–23 at  Düsseldorf
  won both the gold and overall medal tallies.
 March 21–23 at  Tbilisi
 Host nation, won both the gold and overall medal tallies.
 March 28–30 at  Samsun
  won both the gold and overall medal tallies.
 June 6–8 at  Havana
  won the gold medal tally.  and  won 8 overall medals each.
 June 21 & 22 at  Budapest
  won both the gold and overall medal tallies.
 July 4–6 at  Ulaanbaatar
 Both  and host nation, tied in the gold and overall medal tallies.
 September 12–14 at  Zagreb
 Four nations won two gold medals each. Four nations won four overall medals each.
 October 10–12 at  Astana
  and host nation, won 2 gold medals each. However,  won the overall medal tally.
 October 16–18 at  Tashkent
  won both the gold and overall medal tallies.
 November 19–21 at  Qingdao
  won the gold medal tally.  won the overall medal tally.
 November 27–29 at  Jeju City (final)
 Host nation, and  won 6 gold medals each. South Korea won the overall medal tally.
 March 8 – May 18: 2014 EJU Cadets Series
 March 8 & 9: 2014 EJU Cadets #1 in  Zagreb
  won both the gold and overall medal tallies.
 March 17–19: 2014 EJU Cadets #2 in  Antalya
  won both the gold and overall medal tallies.
 March 29 & 30: 2014 EJU Cadets #3 in  Kyiv
 Status: Cancelled, due to the 2014 Crimean crisis.
 April 5 & 6: 2014 EJU Cadets #4 in  Tver
 Host nation, won both the gold and overall medal tallies.
 April 12 & 13: 2014 EJU Cadets #5 in  Coimbra
  won both the gold and overall medal tallies.
 April 26 & 27: 2014 EJU Cadets #6 in  Pitești
  won both the gold and overall medal tallies.
 May 3 & 4:  2014 EJU Cadets #7 in  Berlin
  won both the gold and overall medal tallies.
 May 10 & 11: 2014 EJU Cadets #8 in  Teplice
  won both the gold and overall medal tallies.
 May 17 & 18: 2014 EJU Cadets #9 (final) in  Bielsko-Biała
  and  won 4 gold medals each. However,  won the overall medal tally.
 March 15 – August 3: 2014 EJU Juniors Series
 March 15 & 16: 2014 EJU Juniors #1 in  Coimbra
  won both the gold and overall medal tallies.
 April 5 & 6: 2014 EJU Juniors #2 in  Thessaloniki
  won both the gold and overall medal tallies.
 April 19 & 20: 2014 EJU Juniors #3 in  Saint Petersburg
  won the gold medal tally. Host nation, won the overall medal tally.
 April 26 & 27: 2014 EJU Juniors #4 in  Lignano
  and  won 3 gold medals each. However, host nation, won the overall medal tally.
 May 10 & 11: 2014 EJU Juniors #5 in  Kaunas
  won both the gold and overall medal tallies.
 May 17 & 18: 2014 EJU Juniors #6 in  Deva
  won both the gold and overall medal tallies.
 May 24 & 25: 2014 EJU Juniors #7 in  A Coruña
  won both the gold and overall medal tallies.
 May 31 & June 1: 2014 EJU Juniors #8 in  Leibnitz
  won both the gold and overall medal tallies.
 July 12 & 13: 2014 EJU Juniors #9 in  Paks
  and  won 3 gold medals each.  and Ukraine won 9 overall medals each.
 July 19 & 20: 2014 EJU Juniors #10 in  Wrocław
  won both the gold and overall medal tallies.
 July 26 & 27: 2014 EJU Juniors #11 in  Prague
  won the gold and overall medal tallies.
 August 2 & 3: 2014 EJU Juniors #12 in  Berlin (final)
  won the gold medal tally.  won the overall medal tally.
 March 17 – August 2: 2014 Pan American Open
 March 17 & 18: 2014 Pan American Open #1 in  Montevideo
  won both the gold and overall medal tallies. 
 March 22 & 23: 2014 Pan American Open #2 in  Buenos Aires
  won both the gold and overall medal tallies.
 June 14 & 15: 2014 Pan American Open #3 in  San Salvador
  won the gold medal tally.  and Canada both won 11 overall medals each.
 July 26 & 27: 2014 Pan American Open #4 in  Santiago
  and  won 2 gold medals each. However, Brazil won the overall medal tally.
 August 1 & 2: 2014 Pan American Open Final (#5) in  Miami
  and the  won 4 gold medals each. However, the United States won the overall medal tally.
 March 29 - November 2: 2014 EJU Seniors Series
 March 29 & 30: 2014 EJU Seniors #1 in  Sarajevo
  won both the gold and overall medal tallies.
 May 10 & 11: 2014 EJU Seniors #2 in  London
 Host nation, and  won 4 gold medals each. However,  won the overall medal tally.
 May 17 & 18: 2014 EJU Seniors #3 in  Orenburg
 Host nation,  won both the gold and overall medal tallies.
 June 14 & 15: 2014 EJU Seniors #4 in  Celje-Podčetrtek
  won both the gold and overall medal tallies.
 July 12 & 13: 2014 EJU Seniors #5 in  Sindelfingen
  won the gold medal tally. Host nation, won the overall medal tally.
 September 6 & 7: 2014 EJU Seniors #6 in  Bratislava
  won both the gold and overall medal tallies.
 September 20 & 21: 2014 EJU Seniors #7 in  Tampere
  won both the gold and overall medal tallies.
 September 27 & 28: 2014 EJU Seniors #8 in  Belgrade
  won the gold medal tally. Host nation, won the overall medal tally.
 October 25–29: 2014 EJU Seniors #9 in  Helsingborg
  won both the gold and overall medal tallies.
 November 1 & 2: 2014 EJU Seniors #10 (final) in  Málaga
  and  won 4 gold medals each. Host nation, won the overall medal tally.
 June 21–29: 2014 PJC Cadets and Juniors Series
 June 21 & 22: 2014 Pan American Judo C&D #1 in  Panama City
 Cadets: The  won the gold medal tally. Host nation, won the overall medal tally.
 Juniors:  won the gold medal tally.  won the overall medal tally.
 June 28 & 29: 2014 Pan American Judo C&D #2 in  Irving, Texas (juniors only)
  won the gold medal tally. The host, won the overall medal tally.
 April 24–26: 2014 Pan American Judo Championships in  Guayaquil
  won the gold medal tally.  won the overall medal tally.
 April 24–27: 2014 European Judo Championships in  Montpellier
 Host nation, won both the gold and overall medal tallies.
 April 26 & 27: 2014 IJF Oceania Judo Championships in  Auckland
 Men's Junior Cadets:  won both the gold and overall medal tallies.
 Women's Junior Cadets:  won both the gold and overall medal tallies.
 Men's Juniors:  won both the gold and overall medal tallies.
 Women's Juniors:  won both the gold and overall medal tallies.
 Men's Seniors:  won the gold medal tally.  won the overall medal tally.
 Women's Seniors:  won the gold medal tally. Australia and  both won 8 overall medals each.
 June 26–29: 2014 AJU African Judo Championships in  Port Louis
  and  won 5 gold medals each. However, Algeria won the overall medal tally.
 June 26–29: 2014 EJU European Veterans Championships in  Prague
  won both the gold and overall medal tallies.
 July 4–6: 2014 EJU European Cadets Judo Championships in  Athens
  won both the gold and overall medal tallies.
 July 10–15: 2014 PJC Pan American Cadets & Juniors Judo Championships in  San Salvador
 Cadets:  won both the gold and overall medal tallies.
 Juniors:  won both the gold and overall medal tallies.
 July 27 & 28: 2014 JUA Asian Open in 
However, Chinese Taipei won the overall medal tally.
 August 17–21: 2014 Summer Youth Olympics
 Boys' 55 kg:   Bauyrzhan Zhauyntayev;   Natig Gurbanli;  #1  Jorre Verstraeten;  #2  Oguzhan Karaca
 Boys' 66 kg:   Hifumi Abe;   Bogdan Iadov;  #1  Sukhrob Tursunov;  #2  WU Zhiqiang
 Boys' 81 kg:   Mikhail Igolnikov;   Tamazi Kirakozashvili;  #1  Frank de Wit;  #2  Ivan Felipe Silva Morales
 Boys' 100 kg:   Ramin Safaviyeh;   Rostislav Dashkov;   Domenik Schonefeldt
 Girls' 44 kg:   Melisa Cakmakli;   Leyla Aliyeva;  #1  Anastasya Turcheva;  #2  Honoka Yamauchi
 Girls' 52 kg:   Layana Colman;   Betina Temelkova;  #1  Marusa Stangar;  #2  LEE Hyekyeong
 Girls' 63 kg:   Szabina Gercsák;   Stefania Adelina Dobre;  #1  Jennifer Schwille;  #2  Michaela Polleres
 Girls' 78 kg:   Brigita Matic;   Aleksandra Samardzic;  #1  Sara Rodriguez;  #2  Elvismar Rodriguez
 Mixed Team:  Team Rouge;  Team Geesink;  #1 Team Douillet;  #2 Team Xian
 August 25–31: 2014 World Judo Championships in  Chelyabinsk
  won both the gold and overall medal tallies.
 September 20 & 21: 2014 European Junior Judo Championships in  Bucharest
  and  won 2 gold medals each.  won the overall medal tally.
 September 20–23: 2014 Asian Judo Championships in  Incheon (part of the 2014 Asian Games)
  won the gold medal tally. Japan and hosts  won 15 overall medals each.
 September 21 & 22: 2014 Kata World Championship in  Málaga
 Juno Kata winners:  Wolfgang Dax-Romswinkel and Ulla Loosen
 Katame no Kata winners:  Satoshi Nakayama and Seiji Hayashi
 Nage no Kata winners:  Michito Sakamoto and Takayuki Yokoyama
 Kime no Kata winners:  Kenji Takeishi and Koji Uematsu
 Kodokan Goshin Jitsu winners:  Hideki Miyamoto and Masaki Watanabe
 September 25 – 27: 2014 Veterans Judo World Championship in  Málaga
 M1 and M3: Click here.
 M2, M4, and M5: Click here.
 October 22–26: 2014 IJF World Junior Championships in  Fort Lauderdale, Florida
  won both the gold and overall medal tallies.
 November 14–16: 2014 OJU Oceania Open in  Wollongong
  won the gold medal tally.  won the overall medal tally.
 December 12–14: 2014 JUA Asian Cadets and Junior Championships in 
 Cadets:  won the gold medal tally.  won the overall medal tally.
 Juniors:  won the gold medal tally. Japan, and  won ten overall medals each.

Kickboxing

Kunlun Fight

Taekwondo
 February 8 – December 14: 2014 WTF Calendar of Events
 February 8 & 9 at  Trelleborg
  won the gold medal tally.  won the overall medal tally.
 February 11–16 at  Luxor
  and  won 2 gold medals each. Host nation, won the overall medal tally.
 Note: During the Luxor 2014 competition, Turkish athlete, Seyithan Akbalik, died of a heart attack. He was only 21 years old. RIP.
 February 13–16 at  Montreal (Canadian Open)
  won the gold medal tally. Host nation,  won the overall medal tally.
 February 18–23 at  Las Vegas (US Open)
  won both the gold and overall medal tallies.
 February 20–22 at  Fujairah
  won both the gold and overall medal tallies.
 February 24–26 at  Tehran (Fajr International Open)
 Host nation, won both the gold and overall medal tallies.
 February 27 – March 1 at  Manama (6th Bahrain Open)
However, France won the overall medal tally.
 March 15 & 16 at  Eindhoven
  and  won 2 gold medals each. However, France won the overall medal tally.
 April 4–6 at  Santo Domingo
  won both the gold and overall medal tallies.
 April 11–13 at  Hamburg
  won the gold medal tally.  won the overall medal tally.
 April 18–20 at  Chisinau
However, Ukraine won the overall medal tally.
 April 25–27 at  Kos
  won the gold medal tally. Host nation, won the overall medal tally.
 May 10 & 11 at  Tunis (4th International Carthage Open)
  won the gold medal tally. Host nation, won the overall medal tally.
 May 16–18 at  Castellón de la Plana (Spanish Open)
 Host nation, won both the gold and overall medal tallies.
 May 31 & June 1 at  Innsbruck (Austrian Open)
  won the gold medal tally. Croatia and  won 9 overall medals each.
 June 7 & 8 at  Lausanne (Swiss Open)
  won both the gold and overall medal tallies.
 June 20–22 at  Santa Cruz de la Sierra (Bolivia Open)
  won both the gold and overall medal tallies.
 July 11–16 at  Gyeongju
 Host nation, won both the gold and overall medal tallies in all the senior and junior events contested.
 August 7–10 at  Bogotá (Open de Las Americas) (debut event)
  won the gold medal tally. Host nation, won the overall medal tally.
 August 16 & 17 at  Sydney (5th Australian Open)
  won the gold medal tally. Host nation, won the overall medal tally.
 August 22–24 at  Buenos Aires (Argentina Open)
  won the gold medal tally.  won the overall medal tally.
 August 29–31 at  San José (Costa Rica Open)
  won both the gold and overall medal tallies.
 September 11–15 at  Aguascalientes (Mexico Open)
 Host nation, and the  won 6 gold medals each. However, Mexico won the overall medal tally.
 September 12–14 at  Moscow (Russian Open)
 Host nation, won both the gold and overall medal tallies.
 September 14 & 15 at  Ramla (Israel Open)
Host nation, won the overall medal tally.
 October 3 – 5 at  Kharkiv
 Note: This event has been canceled because of the ongoing 2014 pro-Russian unrest in Ukraine.
 October 18 & 19 at  Belgrade (Serbia Open)
  won the gold medal tally.  won the overall medal tally.
 November 5–7 at  Bangkok (Thailand Open)
 Host nation, won both the gold and overall medal tallies.
 November 15 & 16 at  Zagreb (Croatia Open)
 Host nation, won both the gold and overall medal tallies.
 November 28–30 at  Belek (Turkish Open)
 Seniors: Host nation, and  won 3 gold medals each. Turkey won the overall medal tally.
 Juniors:  won both the gold and overall medal tallies.
 Cadets:  won the gold medal tally.  won the overall medal tally.
 December 12–14 at  Portland, Oregon (Pan American Open) (final)
 The  won the gold and overall medal tallies.
 July 4 – December 4: 2014 WTF Grand Prix
 July 4–6 at  Suzhou
 Host nation, and  won 2 gold medals each. However, South Korea won the overall medal tally.
 August 29–31 at  Astana
 Eight different teams won one gold medal each. Six different team won three overall medals each.
 October 24–26 at  Manchester
  and  won 2 gold medals each. Iran won the overall medal tally.
 December 3 & 4 at  Querétaro (final GP)
  won the gold medal tally.  won the overall medal tally.
 March 23 – 26: 2014 WTF World Junior Taekwondo Championships in  Taipei
  won both the gold and overall medal tallies.
 May 1–5: 2014 European Taekwondo Championships in  Baku
  won the gold medal tally.  won the overall medal tally.
 May 6–8: 2014 African Taekwondo Championships in  Tunis
  won the gold medal tally.  won the overall medal tally.
 May 25–28: 2014 Asian Taekwondo and Taekwondo Poomsae Championships together in  Tashkent
  and  won 5 gold medals each. Iran won the overall medal tally, in combination of the two championships here.
 July 24–27: 2014 WTF World Cadet Taekwondo Championships in  Baku (debut event)
  won the gold medal tally. Iran and  won 6 overall medals each.
 August 14 & 15: 2014 Oceania Taekwondo Championships in  Sydney
 For both the junior and cadets results, click here.
 For the seniors results, click here.
 August 14–22: 2014 World Military Taekwondo Championship in  Tehran
 Men:  won the gold medal tally.  and Iran won 5 overall medals each.
 Women:  and  won 4 gold medals each. Iran won the overall medal tally.
 August 17–21: 2014 Summer Youth Olympics
  and  won 2 gold medals each. Host nation, and Chinese Taipei won 4 overall medals each.
 October 30 – November 2: 2014 WTF World Taekwondo Poomsae Championships in  Aguascalientes
  won the gold medal tally. The  won the overall medal tally.
 December 6 & 7: 2014 World Cup Taekwondo Team Championships in  Querétaro
 Men's Team Champions: ; Second: ; Third:  and 
 Women's Team Champions: ; Second: ; Third:  and

Wrestling
 January 11 – December 7: 2014 FILA Olympic Wrestling Calendar
 January 24–26: First Golden Grand Prix in  Krasnoyarsk
 Host nation, won both the gold and overall medal tallies.
 February 8 & 9: Second Golden Grand Prix in  Paris
  won the gold medal tally.  won the overall medal tally.
 March 1 & 2: Third Golden Grand Prix (Greco-Roman only) in  Szombathely
  won both the gold and overall medal tallies.
 March 15 & 16: Men's Freestyle World Cup in  Los Angeles
 Champions: ; Second: ; Third: .
 March 15 & 16: Women's Freestyle World Cup in  Tokyo
 Champions: ; Second: ; Third: .
 March 19–22: 2014 Oceania Wrestling Championships in  Pago Pago
 Cadet Men's Freestyle:  won the gold medal tally.  won the overall medal tally.
 Cadet Women's Freestyle:  and New Zealand won 1 gold medal each. American Samoa won the overall medal tally.
 Cadet Greco-Roman: New Zealand won the gold medal tally. American Samoa won the overall medal tally.
 Junior Men's Freestyle:  and New Zealand won 3 gold medals each. American Samoa won the overall medal tally.
 Junior Women's Freestyle: New Zealand won the gold medal tally. American Samoa won the overall medal tally.
 Junior Greco-Roman: New Zealand won the gold medal tally. American Samoa won the overall medal tally.
 Senior Men's Freestyle: New Zealand won both the gold and overall medal tallies.
 Senior Women's Freestyle not contested, due to having only 3 female wrestler participants that bothered to attend this event.
 Senior Greco-Roman: American Samoa and New Zealand won 2 gold medals each. However, American Samoa won the overall medal tally.
 Youth Olympic Games Qualifiers for Men's Freestyle: New Zealand won the gold medal tally. American Samoa won the overall medal tally.
 Youth Olympic Games Qualifiers for Women's Freestyle:  and the Marshall Islands won 1 gold medal each. American Samoa won the overall medal tally.
 Youth Olympic Games Qualifiers for Greco-Roman: New Zealand won the gold medal tally. American Samoa won the overall medal tally.
 Overall Beach Wrestling: American Samoa and New Zealand won 3 gold medals each. However, American Samoa won the overall medal tally. 
 March 28–30: 2014 African Wrestling Championships in  Tunis
 Greco-Roman: Host nation, and  tied with 3 gold medals each. Tunisia won the overall medal and team titles.
 Women's Freestyle: Host nation, won the gold medal tally.  and  tied, with 6 overall medals each. Nigeria took the team title.
 Men's Freestyle:  and  both won 2 gold medals each. Host nation, won the overall medal and team titles.
 April 1–6: 2014 European Wrestling Championships in  Vantaa
  won both the gold and overall medal tallies.
 April 2–7: 2014 FILA Central America and Caribbean Championships in  San Juan
  won both the gold and overall medal tallies.
 April 23–27: 2014 Asian Wrestling Championships in  Astana
  won the gold medal tally. Host nation, won the overall medal tally.
 May 2–4: 2014 Pan-American Cadet and YOG Qualification Wrestling Championships in  Recife
 Cadet Men's Freestyle:  won the gold medal tally.  won the overall medal tally.
 Cadet Women's Freestyle: United States won the gold medal tally. Venezuela won the overall medal tally.
 Cadet Greco-Roman: United States won both the gold and overall medal tallies.
 May 6–11: 2014 European Cadet and YOG Qualification Wrestling Championship in  Samokov
 Cadet Men's Freestyle:  won both the gold and overall medal tallies.
 Cadet Women's Freestyle:  won the gold medal tally.  won the overall medal tally.
However, Russia won the overall medal tally.
 May 8–11: 2014 Asian Cadet and YOG Qualification Wrestling Championships in  Bangkok
 Cadet Men's Freestyle:  won the gold medal tally. India and  both won 8 overall medals each.
 Cadet Women's Freestyle:  and  won 3 gold medals each. However, Japan won the overall medal tally.
 Cadet Greco-Roman:  won both the gold and overall medal tallies.
 May 15 & 16: 2014 FILA Greco-Roman Wrestling World Cup in  Tehran
 Host nation, won first place overall, with five wins.
 May 19 & 20: 2014 African Cadet and YOG Qualification Wrestling Championships in  Alexandria
 Cadet Men's Freestyle: Host nation, won the gold medal tally.  won the overall medal tally.
 Cadet Women's Freestyle: Host nation, won both the gold and overall medal tallies.
 Cadet Greco-Roman: A clean sweep of all the gold medals by the host nation . Egypt also won the overall medal tally.
 May 22 & 23: 2014 African Junior Wrestling Championships in  Alexandria
 Junior Men's Freestyle:  won the gold medal tally.  and Egypt won 7 overall medals each.
 Junior Women's Freestyle: Egypt and  won 2 gold medals each. Egypt won the overall medal tally.
 Junior Greco-Roman: Egypt won both the gold and overall medal tallies.
 June 5–8: 2014 Asian Junior Wrestling Championships in  Ulaanbaatar
 Junior Men's Freestyle:  won both the gold and overall medal tallies.
 Junior Women's Freestyle:  won the gold medal tally. Host nation, won the overall medal tally.
 Junior Greco-Roman: Iran won both the gold and overall medal tallies.
 June 17–22: 2014 European Junior Wrestling Championships in  Katowice
 Junior Men's Freestyle:  won the gold medal tally.  won the overall medal tally.
 Junior Women's Freestyle:  won both the gold and overall medal tallies.
 Junior Greco-Roman:  won the gold medal tally.  won the overall medal tally.
 June 27–29: 2014 Pan American Junior Wrestling Championships in  Toronto
 Junior Men's Freestyle: The  won the gold medal tally. Host nation, won the overall medal tally.
 Junior Women's Freestyle: Host nation, won the gold medal tally. Canada and the  won 7 overall medals each.
 Junior Greco-Roman: The  won the gold medal tally. Host nation, and the United States won 5 overall medals each.
 Note: The Greco-Roman 50 kg event was not contested, due to having just one judoka here.
 July 4–6: 2014 World Beach Wrestling Championships in  Katerini, Pieria
 Men's Senior:  and  won 2 gold medals each. Host nation, won the overall medal tally.
 Women Senior: Greece won both the gold and overall medal tallies.
 Men's Junior: Greece won both the gold and overall medal tallies.
 Women's Junior: Greece and  won 1 gold medal each. Greece won the overall medal tally.
 Men's Cadet: Greece won both the gold and overall medal tallies.
 Women's Cadet:  won the gold medal; Norway took the silver and bronze medal in the +50 kg event.
 Note: The 50 kg women's cadet event was not contested, due to having only one Greek wrestler in this category.
 July 15–17: 2014 Pan American Wrestling Championships in  Mexico City
 Men's Freestyle: The  won both the gold and overall medal tallies.
 Women's Freestyle:  won the gold medal tally.  won the overall medal tally.
 Greco-Roman:  won the gold medal tally. The  won the overall medal tally.
 July 15–20: 2014 FILA Cadet World Wrestling Championships in  Snina
 Men's Freestyle: The  won the gold medal tally.  and  won 7 overall medals each.
 Women's Freestyle:  won both the gold and overall medal tallies.
 Greco-Roman:  won the gold medal tally.  and  won 5 overall medals each.
 July 24–27: Final Golden Grand Prix in  Baku
 Men's Freestyle: Host nation, won both the gold and overall medal tallies.
 Women's Freestyle: Host nation, and  won 2 gold medals each. However, Japan won the overall medal tally.
 Greco-Roman: Host nation, won both the gold and overall medal tallies.
 August 5–10: 2014 Junior World Wrestling Championships in  Zagreb
 Men's Freestyle:  and  won 3 gold medals each. Iran and the  won 6 overall medals each.
 Women's Freestyle:  won both the gold and overall medal tallies.
 Greco-Roman:  won both the gold and overall medal tallies.
 August 25–27: 2014 Summer Youth Olympics
  won the gold medal tally.  won the overall medal tally.
 August 26–31: 2014 FILA Veteran World Championships in  Belgrade
 Men's Freestyle:  won both the gold and overall medal tallies.
 Greco-Roman:  won both the gold and overall medal tallies.
 Note: There was only one Russian wrestler in the Greco-Roman 58 kg Group G category.
 September 8–14: 2014 World Wrestling Championships in  Tashkent
  won both the gold and overall medal tallies.
 Men's Freestyle overall team winner: 
 Greco-Roman overall team winner: 
 Women's Freestyle overall team winner:

References

Combat sports
combat